Air Europe was an Italian airline based at Milan Malpensa Airport, Italy. It was, at the time of closure, part of the Alitalia S.p.A. group.

Air Europe suspended operations in December 2008 after Compagnia Aerea Italiana (which was going to take over as the new Alitalia) decided to close down the Air Europe brand. The airline at one time was a subsidiary of the Volare Group which had its head office in Thiene, Italy, and its commercial management and charter management in Milan.

History
The airline was established in 1989 and started operations on 19 December 1989. It started  as part of the Airlines of Europe Group based in the United Kingdom, but became wholly Italian owned in 1991. In December 1997, it inaugurated its first scheduled flight to Havana, Cuba.

It eventually became a subsidiary of Volare Airlines. With this partnership, Air Europe became a major domestic and international airline, operating  Airbus A320, Boeing 737, Boeing 757, Boeing 767 and Boeing 777 aircraft.

In 2004, Volare Group S.p.A. (the holding that controlled Air Europe S.p.A. and Volare Airlines S.p.A.) went bankrupt and was put up for sale by the Italian government in December 2004. Alitalia's offer for 38 million euros was the winning bid, but Air One tried to block the sale for various reasons by going to court - this happened five times and, in fact, so many obstacles were placed in front of Alitalia's acquisition of the group (including Alitalia's financial difficulties), that the affair was considered like a soap-opera by the Italians.

In the end, Air One was unsuccessful but Alitalia had to create Volare S.p.A. (also known as Volareweb.com) in order to take over the then Volare "Group" S.p.A. Finally, in May 2006, the former Volare Group employees were transferred to Volare S.p.A. and Air Europe S.p.A.

By 1 January 2008, the airline (Air Europe) was considered an integral part of the Alitalia Group. That year Alitalia used it for long-haul leisure destinations such as Mauritius.

In September 2008, Compagnia Aerea Italiana (CAI) made an offer to buy Alitalia, to save it from the bankruptcy to which it too was destined, and, on 12 December 2008, the offer was accepted. As a part of the re-branding, CAI decided that it was going to close Air Europe as there was no longer a need for it. As a partner for leisure long-haul operations, it is possible that the "new" Alitalia will use Air Italy, an airline with which Alitalia already has some agreements.

Destinations
Air Europe served the following destinations at the time of closure:

Havana (José Martí International Airport)

Milan (Malpensa International Airport) Hub
Rome (Leonardo da Vinci International Airport) Secondary hub

Montego Bay (Sangster International Airport) (via Havana)

Port Louis (Sir Seewoosagur Ramgoolam International Airport)

Cancún (Cancún International Airport) (via Havana)

Fleet 
The Air Europe fleet consisted of the following aircraft at the time of closure:

1 Boeing 767-300ER

Historic fleet

See also
 List of defunct airlines of Italy

  Air Europe (1979–1991)
  Air Europa (1986-active)

References

External links

Air Europe (Archive)
Air Europa spa (Archive, 1999–2001)
Air Europe spa (Archive, 1999–2001) 
Alitalia

Italian companies established in 1989
Italian companies disestablished in 2008
Defunct airlines of Italy
Airlines established in 1989
Airlines disestablished in 2008